The 70th British Academy Film Awards, more commonly known as the BAFTAs, were held on 12 February 2017 at the Royal Albert Hall in London, honouring the best national and foreign films of 2016. Presented by the British Academy of Film and Television Arts, accolades were handed out for the best feature-length film and documentaries of any nationality that were screened at British cinemas in 2016.

The nominees were announced on 10 January 2017 by actor Dominic Cooper and actress Sophie Turner. La La Land received the most nominations in twelve categories; Arrival and Nocturnal Animals followed with nine each.

Winners and nominees

The nominees were announced on 10 January 2017. The winners were announced on 12 February 2017.

BAFTA Fellowship
 Mel Brooks Joanna Lumley

Outstanding British Contribution to Cinema
 Curzon

Statistics

Ceremony information
The ceremony was broadcast on BBC One at 9 p.m. UTC, around two hours later than the actual ceremony. For the 12th time, Stephen Fry acted as the host. The ceremony returned to the Royal Albert Hall for the first time since 1997, as the Royal Opera House, which has hosted the awards since 2008, was being refurbished.

Following criticism at the lack of representation of ethnic minorities from the previous ceremony, BAFTA had announced steps to increase diversity across the industry, on both sides of the camera. However, there was again criticism at the lack of representation of Black, Asian and minority ethnic (BAME) actors, directors and films in the nominations. In the leading actor, actress and director fields, there were no BAME nominees, with the omission of director Barry Jenkins for Moonlight and actor/director Denzel Washington for Fences highlighted as particularly noteworthy.

La La Land won the most awards at the event, winning five—Best Picture, Best Director for Damien Chazelle, Best Actress in a Leading Role for Emma Stone, Best Cinematography for Linus Sandgren, and Best Original Music for Justin Hurwitz. Casey Affleck won Best Actor in a Leading Role for Manchester by the Sea, Dev Patel won Best Actor in a Supporting Role for Lion, and Viola Davis won Best Actress in a Supporting Role for Fences.

Cellist Sheku Kanneh-Mason performed a solo interpretation of Leonard Cohen's "Hallelujah" to accompany the In Memoriam section. Those remembered were Gene Wilder, Garry Marshall, Sue Gibson, Kenny Baker, Tony Dyson, Peter Shaffer, Paul Lewis, Michael White, Ken Adam, Guy Hamilton, Debbie Reynolds, Carrie Fisher, Abbas Kiarostami, Jim Clark, Simon Relph, Douglas Slocombe, Anton Yelchin, Robin Hardy, David Rose, Curtis Hanson, Clare Wise, Om Puri, Alec McCowen, Emmanuelle Riva, Andrzej Wajda, Michael Cimino, Antony Gibbs, and Sir John Hurt.

In Memoriam

Gene Wilder
Garry Marshall
Sue Gibson
Kenny Baker
Tony Dyson
Peter Shaffer
Paul Cowan
Michael White
Ken Adam
Guy Hamilton
Debbie Reynolds
Carrie Fisher
Abbas Kiarostami
Jim Clark
Simon Relph
Douglas Slocombe
Anton Yelchin
Robin Hardy
David Rose
Curtis Hanson
Clare Wise
Om Puri
Alec McCowen
Emmanuelle Riva
Andrzej Wajda
Michael Cimino
Tony Gibbs
John Hurt

See also
 6th AACTA International Awards
 89th Academy Awards
 42nd César Awards
 22nd Critics' Choice Awards
 69th Directors Guild of America Awards
 30th European Film Awards
 74th Golden Globe Awards
 37th Golden Raspberry Awards
 31st Goya Awards
 32nd Independent Spirit Awards
 22nd Lumières Awards
 7th Magritte Awards
 4th Platino Awards
 28th Producers Guild of America Awards
 21st Satellite Awards
 43rd Saturn Awards
 23rd Screen Actors Guild Awards
 69th Writers Guild of America Awards

References

External links
 

2016 film awards
2017 in London
Film069
February 2017 events in the United Kingdom
Events at the Royal Albert Hall
2017 in British cinema
2016 awards in the United Kingdom